The Campos do Jordão State Park is a state park in the state of São Paulo, Brazil.

Location

It occupies one third of the municipality of Campos do Jordão, São Paulo, on the border with Minas Gerais.
The park contains an important remnant of Atlantic Forest, including Araucária and Podocarpus forest, alpine meadows and cloud forest. 
There is diverse fauna with more than 186 known species of birds and endangered animals such as cougar (Puma concolor), ocelot (Leopardus pardalis) and the vinaceous-breasted amazon (Amazona vinacea).

The park has a visitor center, barbecues, fitness area, nurseries, showers, chapel, restaurant, craft shop and trails for walking and cycling. 
A  wooden tower gives a panoramic view.
The Sapucaí River and Four Bridges trails follow the Sapucaí River.
Other more or less challenging trails lead to the Gargalhada and Celestina waterfalls.

History

The Campos do Jordão State Park was created on 27 March 1941.
When the state park was created a policy of encouraging reforestation with exotic species was followed, with conifers introduced in large areas.
 were degraded by planting pines, mostly pinus elliottii and pinus taeda.
These should be removed through sustainable forest management to allow the natural local vegetation to regenerate.

Management of the park is integrated with the  Mananciais de Campos do Jordão State Park, created in 1993 to protect the water supply of the municipal seat.
The park is part of the Mantiqueira Environmental Protection Area.
It is also part of the  Mantiqueira Mosaic, created in 2006.

Notes

Sources

State parks of Brazil
1941 establishments in Brazil
Protected areas of São Paulo (state)